Under the Bridges is a 1946 German drama film directed by Helmut Käutner and starring Hannelore Schroth, Carl Raddatz and Gustav Knuth. The film was shot in Berlin during the summer of 1944, but was not released until after the defeat of Nazi Germany. It premiered in Locarno in September 1946, and wasn't released in Germany until 1950 when it was picked up for distribution by Gloria Film.

The film uses poetic realism to portray the everyday lives and romances of two Havel boatmen. In 1995, a survey among more than 300 film experts voted Unter den Brücken at No. 18 of the 100 most important German films.

Cast 
 Hannelore Schroth as Anna Altmann
 Carl Raddatz as Hendrik Feldkamp
 Gustav Knuth as Willy
 Margarete Haagen as Landlady
 Ursula Grabley as Vera, a waitress
 Hildegard Knef as Girl in Havelberg
 Walter Gross as Man on the bridge
 Helene Westphal
 Hildegard König
 Erich Dunskus as Holl, ship captain
 Klaus Pohl as Museum's employee
 Helmuth Helsig as Muhlke - Café owner

See also
 Überläufer

References

Bibliography 
 Kreimeier, Klaus. The Ufa Story: A History of Germany's Greatest Film Company, 1918–1945. University of California Press, 1999.

External links 
 
 Unter den Brücken Full movie with English subtitles at Deutsche Filmothek

1946 films
West German films
German drama films
German black-and-white films
1946 drama films
1940s German-language films
Films directed by Helmut Käutner
Films set in Berlin
Films shot in Berlin
Seafaring films
Gloria Film films
UFA GmbH films
Terra Film films
1940s German films